Rambling Boy may refer to:
 Ramblin' Boy, a 1964 album by Tom Paxton
 Rambling Boy (Charlie Haden album), 2008